Palcamayo District is one of nine districts of the province Tarma in Peru.

See also 
 Pukara Punta

References